Anastasia Motaung (died 14 August 2022) was a South African politician from the African National Congress. She was a member of the National Assembly of South Africa from 2019 until her death in 2022.

Death
Motaung died after a short illness on 14 August 2022.

References 

20th-century births
2022 deaths
Members of the National Assembly of South Africa
African National Congress politicians
Women members of the National Assembly of South Africa
21st-century South African politicians
21st-century South African women politicians